Plasma gelsolin (pGSN) is an 83 kDa abundant protein constituent of normal plasma and an important component of the innate immune system. The identification of pGSN in Drosophila melanogaster and C. elegans points to an ancient origin early in evolution. Its extraordinary structural conservation reflects its critical regulatory role in multiple essential functions. Its roles include the breakdown of filamentous actin released from dead cells, activation of macrophages, and localization of the inflammatory response. Substantial decreases in plasma levels are observed in acute and chronic infection and injury in both animal models and in humans. Supplementation therapies with recombinant human pGSN have been shown effective in more than 20 animal models.

pGSN has a cytoplasmic isoform (cGSN) known to be an actin-binding protein controlling cytoskeletal dynamics. cGSN is expressed from the same gene, and is identical to pGSN except for its lack of a 24 amino acid N-terminal extension.

History
The cellular isoform of Gelsolin was discovered in 1979 in the lab of Thomas P. Stossel. Its name comes from observed calcium-dependent reversible gel-sol transitions of macrophage cytoplasmic extract. Around the same time a similarly sized plasma protein was discovered and shown to depolymerize actin; it was named Brevin, due to its ability to shorten actin filaments.
In 1986 it was demonstrated that Brevin was identical to cellular Gelsolin except for a 24 AA N-terminal extension, and was renamed Plasma Gelsolin.

Structure

Plasma Gelsolin is a 755 AA, 83 kDa plasma protein made up of six "gelsolin domains," each composed of a 5-6 strand β-sheet between one long and one short α-helix.
It exhibits a weak homology between domains S1 and S4, S2 and S5, and S3 and S6, and is identical to the cytoplasmic form of the protein except for the addition of a 24 AA N-terminal extension. Additionally a 27 AA N-terminal signal peptide is cleaved prior to pGSN's secretion from the cell. Both forms of the protein are encoded by highly conserved genes on chromosome 9 in humans, but are under the control of different promoters.
There is a single disulfide bond formed on the second domain of the plasma protein, there are no documented natural post-translational modifications, and the pI ≈ 6.

Isoforms and mutations
Aside from the cellular form, the only other known isoform is Gelsolin-3, an identical non-secreted protein containing an 11 AA, rather than 24 AA, N-terminal extension. It has been found in brain, testes, and lung oligodendrocytes, and is reportedly involved in myelin remodeling during spiralization around the axon.

Plasma Gelsolin is highly conserved, and its only known mutations are single point mutations.
One of several such mutations leads to Finnish Familial Amyloidosis, a disorder in which pGSN becomes more conformationally flexible and susceptible to enzymatic cleavage resulting in accumulation of peptide fragments into amyloid fibrils.
D187N/Y is the most common mutation with additional reports of G167R, N184K, P432R, A551P, and Ala7fs in the medical literature.
In addition to this several mutations as well as down-regulation of the protein are associated with breast cancer.

Ca2+
At moderate pH in the absence of Ca2+ pGSN is compact and globular. Low pH or the presence of >nM Ca2+ is associated with an elongated structure with greater backbone flexibility.
This flexibility exposes the actin binding sites.
Since physiological levels of Ca2+ are ~2 mM, pGSN is natively elongated and able to bind to leaked actin from cellular damage.

Functions

Binding
Plasma Gelsolin is a sticky protein known to bind to a number of peptides and proteins:
Actin (see: Relationships with actin),
Apo-H,
Aβ,
α-Synuclein,
Integrin,
Tcp-1,
Fibronectin,
Syntaxin-4,
Tropomyosin,
fatty acids and phospholipids (see: Binding and inactivation of diverse inflammatory mediators): LPA,
LPS (endotoxin),
LTA,
PAF,
S1P, 
polyphosphoinositides including PIP2; 
and nucleic acids: Ap3A,
ATP,
ADP.
PIP2, a phospholipid component of cell membranes, competes with ATP and actin for pGSN binding, and will dissociate F-Actin-capped pGSN.

Relationships with actin

Actin toxicity and removal

Actin is the most abundant cellular protein, and its release into extracellular fluid and circulation following cellular injury from disease or injury leads to increased blood viscosity, hindered microcirculation, and activation of platelets. Hemodialysis patients with low levels of pGSN and high levels of actin in blood had markedly higher mortality. Actin is a major component of biofilms that accumulate at local sites of injury and infection, impeding access of host immune components and therapeutics such as antibiotics.
Biofilms are particularly pathogenic in the setting of foreign bodies like indwelling catheters and tissue implants.

Actin exchanges between monomeric (G) and filamentous (F) forms according to the concentrations of it, ATP, and cations.
pGSN along with Vitamin D-binding protein (DBP) bind and clear monomeric actin. DBP binds with greater affinity to G-actin, leaving pGSN available to sever F-actin. Furthermore, DBP is capable of removing one actin from a 2:1 actin-pGSN complex, restoring its ability to sever F-actin.
F-actin, severed and capped by pGSN, is removed by sinusoidal endothelial cells of the liver. pGSN removes 60% of actin trapped in fibrin clots in vitro leading to an increased rate of clot lysis.

Severing, capping, nucleation, and polymerization
Although pGSN is capable of initiating the polymerization of actin through nucleation, its primary relationship with it in blood is depolymerization through filament severing. Actin severing occurs rapidly in the presence of pGSN and Ca2+.
pGSN wraps around filaments, non-enzymatically cleaving them.
It remains attached, "capping" the barbed/plus end of the severed filament and inducing a torsional twist that is cooperative through its length. Capping has a reported binding affinity <250 pM in the presence of Ca2+ that is substantially weakened in its absence. Capping also blocks further polymerization at the fast growing, barbed end.

While no evidence exists for nucleating/polymerizing of G-actin by pGSN in vivo, the ability of it to do so in vitro is well documented.
Actin polymerization is initiated by the production of an actin trimer nucleus.
Formation of nuclei is energetically disfavored, but dimers and/or trimers can be catalyzed/stabilized by a number of cellular proteins.
In excess of a 2:1 actin:gelsolin stoichiometry and in the presence of Ca2+, gelsolin will bind three actin monomers.
A monomer adds to the trimer creating a tetramer that undergoes an internal conversion to an active tetramer witnessed by a concentration-independent lag phase. Subsequent fibrilization proceeds by monomer addition.
Gelsolin remains attached to the fast-growing (barbed/plus) end of actin, producing short, slow-growing fibrils.

These actions are similar to those of cytoplasmic form of pGSN, cGSN, which contributes to structural changes of cells through both nucleating/polymerizing and severing/capping.

Amyloid prevention and clearance
pGSN may play an important role in the prevention and management of amyloidosis in several diseases. It is found in complex with Aβ in plasma and reported to both inhibit amyloid formation and defibrillize preformed fibrils in vitro. Mice with an Alzheimer's disease model given pGSN showed a 5-fold decrease in progression of Cerebral Amyloid Angiopathy. pGSN has also been found in Lewy Bodies, amyloid containing protein aggregates associated with Parkinson's disease and Dementia with Lewy bodies.

Role in inflammation

Macrophage stimulation

MARCO receptor
Macrophage receptor MARCO is responsible for pathogen recognition and phagocytosis. Macrophages incubated with actin at concentrations consistent with lung injury showed decreased uptake of bacteria. Uptake was restored when actin was administered in the presence of pGSN.

NOS3
NOS3 is an enzyme that is protective against systemic inflammation and myocardial dysfunction.
pGSN activates phosphorylation of Ser1177 in NOS3 and Ser473 in Akt.
NOS3 is known to be activated by phosphorylation of Akt.
Mouse macrophage uptake and killing of bacteria in vitro was enhanced by pGSN, and no significant enhancement was found for NOS3-/- macrophages.
In vivo, mice showed 15-fold improvement in bacterial clearance when given pGSN, and no significant enhancement was found for NOS3-/- mice.

Inflammatory mediators
pGSN has been shown to bind to the fatty acid inflammatory mediators LPA,
LPS (endotoxin),
LTA, 
PAF,
S1P,
and polyphosphoinositides including PIP2. Mediators of inflammation, the body's innate healing mechanism, accumulate at the site of the injury to begin the processes of defense and repair, and the depletion of local pGSN allows them to do their work.

See Binding and inactivation of diverse inflammatory mediators

Therapeutic potential
The broad therapeutic potential of pGSN supplementation resides in the fact that the molecule embodies a multifunctional system contributing importantly to innate immunity rather than a pharmacologic intervention with selective and specific activities.

Plasma gelsolin's primary function is to keep inflammation local and enhance the function of the innate immune system. It functions through a pleiotropic mechanism of action; severing toxic filamentous actin (F-actin), binding inflammatory mediators, and enhancing pathogen clearance. These mechanisms are quite distinct from other anti-inflammatory agents that function as antagonists of individual mediators or inhibitors of specific enzymes, and work to ablate inflammation. Most systemic anti-inflammatory agents also suppress the immune system
and often require caution in administration because they increase the risk of infection.
Plasma gelsolin is unique in that it has also been demonstrated to enhance the antimicrobial action of macrophages, which engulf and digest cellular debris and pathogens, boosting immunity against both gram positive and gram negative bacterial infections.

Mechanisms of action
Plasma gelsolin plays a central role in the body's innate immune system and is responsible for localizing inflammation—a mechanism so central to species survival that it has been highly conserved by evolution. Experimental and epidemiology data suggest that pGSN performs the role of a buffer or shield that modulates the inflammatory response to injury or infection. The system accomplishes this goal in three key ways described below:

Debridement
Plasma gelsolin binds and severs filamentous actin exposed from cells damaged by injury, including both infectious and sterile injury. Actin has been reported to activate platelets, interfere with fibrinolysis,
damage endothelial cells, and to function as a danger signal (DAMP).
Administration of large quantities of filamentous actin to rats resulted in lethal pulmonary hemorrhage and thrombosis.

Another key “toxicity” of exposed actin is the fact that it is a major component of biofilms that accumulate at local sites of injury and infection, and that it impedes the access of host immune components and therapeutics such as antibiotics.
Biofilms are particularly pathogenic in the setting of foreign bodies like indwelling catheters and tissue implants. As a result of actin exposure at the local site of injury, the local level of plasma gelsolin around the site of the injury initially becomes depleted as it “debrides” the local involved site. Mediators of inflammation, the body's innate healing mechanism, accumulate at the site of the injury to begin the processes of defense and repair, and the depletion of local plasma gelsolin allows them to do their work. While local pGSN levels are depressed, the presence of this abundant protein in the circulation ensures that the inflammatory process stays local, and that stores of plasma gelsolin are available to address further injury so that the overall immune response remains intact.

Augmentation of macrophage antimicrobial activity
pGSN has antimicrobial activity in vitro and in vivo. Administration of pGSN subcutaneously or by inhalation to mice challenged with lethal inocula of S. pneumoniae or even more lethal combinations of influenza virus and bacteria markedly diminished the number of viable bacteria in the animals’ airways and significantly reduced mortality. The number of inflammation-inducing neutrophils was also considerably reduced, presumably as a result of enhanced bacterial clearance. This is true for contemporaneous or delayed administration of recombinant pGSN.

A basis of pGSN's antimicrobial action is that it enhances the ability of cultivated lung macrophages to ingest gram positive and gram negative bacteria. This has been demonstrated in vitro. Improved phagocytosis is the product of pGSN debriding actin bound to macrophage scavenger receptors preventing their function. pGSN also increases the ability of macrophages to kill ingested microorganisms by inducing macrophage nitric oxide synthase activity.

Binding and inactivation of diverse inflammatory mediators
pGSN binds to a number of inflammatory mediators and signaling agents.
Binding to LPA occurs at the same site on the molecule that ligates actin and interacts with polyphosphoinositides. Subsequent studies showed that gelsolin alters the effector function of LPA's receptor binding. Binding to inflammatory mediators, and in some cases inhibition of their effector function, has been shown for platelet-activating factor, lipopolysaccharide endotoxin, sphingosine-1-phosphate, and lipoteichoic acid and small molecule purinergic agonists including ATP and ADP. The binding of pGSN to Aβ Alzheimer peptide has also been well documented.

Anti-microbial resistance
Antimicrobial resistance is a global threat that leads to an estimated 700,000 deaths annually with projections of 10M deaths per year and lost economic potential of $100T by 2050.
The United States has released a national action plan to combat antibiotic resistant bacteria.

Recombinant pGSN (rhu-pGSN) supplementation alone shows improved survival and decreased bacteria counts in several mouse models.
The bactericidal activity of the antimicrobial peptide LL-37 was shown to be inhibited by F-actin. It formed bundles with F-actin in vitro that were dissolved by pGSN, restoring bactericidal activity. Bacteria growth was reduced when pGSN was added cystic fibrosis sputum, which is known to contain F-actin.

When mice were given a penicillin-resistant strain of pneumococcal pneumonia, penicillin had no effect on mortality or morbidity. rhu-pGSN improved both mortality and morbidity on its own, and the combination of rhu-pGSN and penicillin gave further improvement of both suggesting possible synergism.

Levels of the Protein
Plasma gelsolin is produced and secreted by virtually every cell type with muscle contributing the largest amount. At normal levels of >200 mg/L, it is a highly abundant protein in the circulation.

Decreased levels are often associated with ill health and disease.
A growing list of insults showing loss of pGSN includes pneumonia,
sepsis,
SIRS,
traumatic brain injury,
autoimmune diseases,
chronic kidney disease,
HIV-1 disease,
tick-borne encephalitis and Lyme,
malaria,
hepatitis,
burns,
multiple organ dysfunction syndrome,
trauma associated with injury or surgery,
bone marrow transplantation,
and multiple sclerosis.
Severely depleted levels (<150 mg/L) strongly correlate with the onset of systemic inflammatory dysregulation and predict increased morbidity and mortality across a broad spectrum of clinical presentations in the critical care setting. The magnitude of decline in pGSN correlates with the likelihood of mortality in seriously ill patients.

Mediators of inflammation, the body's innate healing mechanism, accumulate at the site of the injury to begin the processes of defense and repair, and the depletion of local plasma gelsolin allows them to do their work.
As a result of actin exposure at the local site of injury, the local level of plasma gelsolin around the site of the injury initially becomes depleted as it “debrides” the local involved site (see: Debridement).
While local pGSN levels are depressed, the presence of this abundant protein in the circulation ensures that the inflammatory process stays local, and that stores of plasma gelsolin are available to address further injury so that the overall immune response remains intact (see: Binding and inactivation of diverse inflammatory mediators).

Measured levels are higher in serum than plasma due to pGSN's affinity for fibrin.

Animal studies

Human plasma gelsolin has been produced in recombinant form in E. coli (rhu-pGSN), and its efficacy as a therapeutic has been studied in vivo in a number of animal models of inflammatory disease. In models of injury that cause actin release and inflammatory organ damage, pGSN levels consistently drop. In models where gelsolin levels are replenished, adverse outcomes can be prevented. To date, rhu-pGSN has been studied in many independent laboratories providing evidence of efficacy in >20 animal models. Following are descriptions of selected animal studies. All stated results are relative to those of placebo treatments.

Human Studies
In 2019 BioAegis Therapeutics conducted a Phase Ib/IIa safety study administering recombinant human pGSN to sick patients with community acquired pneumonia; no safety issues were found.
A 2020 Phase IIb placebo-controlled efficacy study has been approved for acute severe pneumonia due to COVID-19. The primary outcome was the proportion of patients surviving on Day 14 without mechanical ventilation, vasopressors, or dialysis. Evaluation of efficacy of rhu-pGSN was confounded by high survival rates of both treatment and placebo cohorts resulting from improvements made to the standard of care for COVID pneumonia.

See also
Cytoplasmic gelsolin

Actin

Vitamin D-binding protein

References

Proteins